Giampiero Maini (born 29 September 1971) is a retired Italian professional footballer who played as a midfielder.

Club career
Maini began his career with Italian club Roma, where he won the Coppa Italia in 1991, later being loaned out to Lecce and Ascoli. He later also played for Vicenza, Milan, Bologna, Parma, Ancona, and Arezzo, before ending his career with Fabriano.

Whilst at Vicenza he won his second Coppa Italia title in 1997, scoring a goal in the 2nd leg of the final against Napoli.

In 1997, he joined Milan. He spent a year at the club and scored once; his goal coming in a Coppa Italia tie against Sampdoria, as Milan went on to reach the final, only to be defeated by Lazio.

He won his third and final Coppa Italia title with Parma in 2002 and the Supercoppa Italiana in 1999.

International career
Maini was named in Italy's squad for 1997 Tournoi de France under manager Cesare Maldini. At the tournament he made his first and only appearance for the national team in a 2–0 loss to England.

Honours
Roma
 Coppa Italia winner: 1990–91.

Vicenza
 Coppa Italia winner: 1996–97.

Parma
 Supercoppa Italiana winner: 1999.
 Coppa Italia winner: 2001–02.

References

External links

 

1971 births
Living people
Italian footballers
Italy international footballers
Italy under-21 international footballers
Serie A players
Serie B players
A.S. Roma players
U.S. Lecce players
Ascoli Calcio 1898 F.C. players
L.R. Vicenza players
A.C. Milan players
Bologna F.C. 1909 players
Parma Calcio 1913 players
Venezia F.C. players
A.C. Ancona players
S.S. Arezzo players

Association football midfielders